George William Upham (January 28, 1862 – July 14, 1923) was a Canadian politician. He served in the Legislative Assembly of New Brunswick as a member from Carleton County.

References 

1862 births
1907 deaths
Independent New Brunswick MLAs
People from Woodstock, New Brunswick